Montieri is a comune (municipality) in the Province of Grosseto in the Italian region Tuscany, located about  south of Florence and about  north of Grosseto.

Among the churches in the town is the 14th-century church of Santi Michele e Paolo with a painting attributed to Taddeo Gaddi.

Frazioni 
The municipality is formed by the municipal seat of Montieri and the villages (frazioni) of Boccheggiano, Gerfalco and Travale.

References

External links

 Town official website